Nowe Kotkowice-Chudoba , German Neu Kuttendorf-Schekai is a village in the administrative district of Gmina Głogówek (Gemeinde Oberglogau), within Prudnik County, Opole Voivodeship, in south-western Poland, close to the Czech border.

Since 2009 the village, like much of the surrounding area, has been officially bilingual in German and Polish.

References

Nowe Kotkowice-Chudoba